Elst is a town in the municipality of Overbetuwe in the Dutch province of Gelderland. It is situated in the Betuwe, between the cities of Arnhem and Nijmegen. Elst has 21,447 inhabitants.

Elst is known for its Roman temples, which are situated under the Saint Werenfried church. Elst was a separate municipality until 2001, when it became a part of Overbetuwe.

H. J. Heinz Company's sauce factory for the European market is located south of the town centre.

Elstar is an apple cultivar that was developed in Elst in the 1950s.

Education
Elst is home to three high schools: Het Westeraam, Lyceum and Over Betuwe College Elst (OBC Elst).

Sports
There are several sports clubs in Elst, including:

Spero (Football)
BCE (badminton)
Elistha (Football)
ETV (tennis)
EZ & PC (swimming)
Gaviiformes (scuba diving)
Gemini (Volleyball)
HCOB (field hockey)
Unlimited (basketball)
Budo vereniging (martial arts)

The Linge near Elst

People born in Elst
Frits Kuipers (1899–1943), footballer
Pierre Kartner (1935–2022), singer and composer
Paul Kuypers (1939–1971), agricultural scientist
Jeffrey Leiwakabessy (born 1981), footballer
Henk "Henkie" Leeuwis (born 1946), singer
Dirk Proper (born 2002), footballer
Peter J. Williamson (1823–1907), architect (Vanderbilt University), American Civil War adjutant to General William T. Sherman
Jan Zwartkruis (1925–2013), footballer

Transportation
Elst railway station

References

Municipalities of the Netherlands disestablished in 2001
Populated places in Gelderland
Former municipalities of Gelderland
Overbetuwe